Klapperhorn Mountain is a summit in British Columbia, Canada.

Description 

Klapperhorn Mountain, elevation 2,301-meters (7,549-feet), is located in Mount Robson Provincial Park, just south and within view of the park's visitor centre. It is the northernmost peak of the Selwyn Range, which is a subrange of the Canadian Rockies. Precipitation runoff from the peak drains north into the Fraser River. The Yellowhead Highway (Highway 16) and Canadian National Railway traverse the northern base of the mountain. The nearest neighbor is line parent Overlander Mountain,  to the southeast.

Etymology
The mountain was named by BC Parks on March 13, 1972, and the toponym was officially adopted December 19, 1978, by the Geographical Names Board of Canada. The mountain is a classic horn-shaped summit, which is notable for the frequency of its rockslides which are audible to campers and are a source of much curiosity and interest.

Climate

Based on the Köppen climate classification, Klapperhorn Mountain is located in a subarctic climate zone with cold, snowy winters, and mild summers. Winter temperatures can drop below −20 °C with wind chill factors below −30 °C.

See also
 
 Geography of British Columbia

Gallery

References

External links
Mount Robson Provincial Park website—BC Parks
 Klapperhorn Mountain: weather forecast

Canadian Rockies
Two-thousanders of British Columbia
Robson Valley
Cariboo Land District
Mount Robson Provincial Park